"Like My Dog" is a song written by Harley Allen and Scotty Emerick and recorded by American country music artist Billy Currington. It was released in October 2011 as the fourth and final single from Currington's 2010 album Enjoy Yourself. The song peaked at number 24 on the U.S. Billboard Hot Country Songs chart.

Critical reception
Billy Dukes of Taste of Country gave the song a four-and-a-half-out-of-five star rating, describing it as "cute and a little superficial, but impossible to ignore or not fall in love with." Matt Bjorke of Roughstock gave the song four stars out of five, writing that it's "a clever and undeniably country tune with a laid-back melody that suits Billy's strong country voice."

Chart performance
"Like My Dog" debuted at number 53 on the U.S. Billboard Hot Country Songs chart for the week of October 22, 2011.

Year-end charts

References

2011 singles
Songs about dogs
Billy Currington songs
Mercury Nashville singles
Songs written by Harley Allen
Songs written by Scotty Emerick
Song recordings produced by Carson Chamberlain
2010 songs